Llangynhafal is a village and community to the north of Ruthin, in Denbighshire, North Wales. It has a thriving public house, the Golden Lion. The community includes the village of Gellifor.

Llangynhafal is the home of Ty Gwalia, which is the north Wales rural hub for the national charity Woody’s Lodge. 

Woody’s Lodge is a social hub, which guides veterans to the help & support they need to re-engage with their families and communities. The charities vision is to create an inviting meeting space for those who have served within the Armed Forces and Emergency Services, where they can receive expert support & advice as well as the chance to connect with new and old friends & family. Ty Gwalia sits at the foot of Moel Famau in the Clwydian Range and enjoys expansive farmlands and mountainous backdrops. It is for those who appreciate fun outdoor activities set amid magnificent countryside views.

References

 
Villages in Denbighshire
Communities in Denbighshire